Osteen may refer to:

Osteen (surname)
Osteen, Florida,  unincorporated community in the United States
Osteen Bridge or Douglas Stenstrom Bridge, a steel-and-concrete bridge located in Indian Mound Village, Florida
Osteen (mango), a commercial mango cultivar that originated on Merritt Island, Florida